Morsø is a municipality (Danish, kommune) in Region Nordjylland in northern Denmark.   The municipality is located on the island of Morsø or Mors, an island in the Limfjord, the sound that separates the island of Vendsyssel-Thy from the rest of Jutland Peninsula.  The municipality includes the smaller island of Agerø, and covers an area of 368 km².  It has a total population of 20,068 (2022).  Its mayor is Egon Pleidrup Poulsen, a member of the Social Democrats (Socialdemokraterne) political party.

The main town and the site of its municipal council is the town of Nykøbing Mors.

Because Morsø municipality comprises the entirety of the island, all municipal neighbors are separated by a body of water.

Before the bridge was built there was a train ferry connection over the strait from the town of Nykøbing to Glyngøre, and a car ferry connection between  Pinen at Mors and Plagen at Salling (i.e. "Pinen og Plagen" meaning "the Pain and the Torment").

Morsø municipality was not merged with other municipalities by 1 January 2007 as the result of nationwide Kommunalreformen ("The Municipal Reform" of 2007).

Politics

Municipal council
Morsø's municipal council consists of 21 members, elected every four years.

Below are the municipal councils elected since the Municipal Reform of 2007.

Attractions
 Dueholm Cloister (Dueholm Kloster)
 Højris
 Jesperhus Flower Park (Jesperhus Blomsterpark)
 Moler Museum (Molermuseum)

References 

 Municipal statistics: NetBorger Kommunefakta, delivered from KMD aka Kommunedata (Municipal Data)
 Municipal mergers and neighbors: Eniro new municipalities map

External links 

 Municipality's official website

 
Municipalities of the North Jutland Region
Municipalities of Denmark